Fairgarden is a census-designated place in Sevier County, Tennessee, United States. Its population was 529 as of the 2010 census.

Demographics

2020 census

As of the 2020 United States census, there were 481 people, 186 households, and 153 families residing in the CDP.

References

Census-designated places in Sevier County, Tennessee
Census-designated places in Tennessee